Cristián Jiménez (born 1975) is a filmmaker from southern Chile who is best known for low-key slacker dramas and dramadies. He won the 2013 Altazor Award for best direction for the TV series El Reemplazante.

Select filmography
 Optical Illusions (2009)
 Bonsai (2011)
 Voice Over (2014)
 Family Life (2017; with Alicia Scherson)

References

External links

Chilean film directors
Living people
1975 births